Jashimuddin (born 26 December 1995) is a Bangladeshi first-class cricketer who plays for Chittagong Division.

See also
 List of Chittagong Division cricketers

References

External links
 

1995 births
Living people
Bangladeshi cricketers
Chittagong Division cricketers
Place of birth missing (living people)